George Flint is a basketball player and coach.

George Flint may also refer to:

George Flint (American football) (born 1937), American football guard
George Washington Flint (1844–1921), American academic administrator
Major George Flint of Mixed Armistice Commissions

See also
George Flinter, adventurer
George Flynn (disambiguation)